Lisandro Sugezky (born 8 June 1945) is an Argentine sports shooter. He competed in two events at the 1988 Summer Olympics.

References

1945 births
Living people
Argentine male sport shooters
Olympic shooters of Argentina
Shooters at the 1988 Summer Olympics
Place of birth missing (living people)